Egzon Shala (born November 23, 1990) is a Kosovan-Albanian freestyle wrestler. Representing Albania, he earned a bronze medal at the 2013 Mediterranean Games. Representing Kosovo, he qualified for the 2020 Summer Olympics from the 2019 World Wrestling Championships after he was promoted from 5th place as two athlete (Syrian Badzha Khutaba and Uzbek Khasanboy Rakhimov) were disqualified due to doping violations.

Major results

References

External links
 

1990 births
Living people
Albanian male sport wrestlers
Kosovan male sport wrestlers
Competitors at the 2015 European Games
Competitors at the 2013 Mediterranean Games
Competitors at the 2022 Mediterranean Games
Mediterranean Games bronze medalists for Albania
Mediterranean Games medalists in wrestling
Mediterranean Games competitors for Kosovo
Wrestlers at the 2020 Summer Olympics
Olympic wrestlers of Kosovo